Horst Drinda (1 May 1927 – 21 February 2005) was a German actor. He appeared in more than ninety films from 1948 to 2003.

Partial filmography

References

External links 

1927 births
2005 deaths
German male film actors